Pohoří is a municipality and village in Rychnov nad Kněžnou District in the Hradec Králové Region of the Czech Republic. It has about 700 inhabitants.

Twin towns – sister cities

Pohoří is twinned with:
 Piława Górna, Poland

References

Villages in Rychnov nad Kněžnou District